The COMAR d'Or is a series of Tunisian literary prizes created in 1996 by the Compagnie méditerranéenne d'assurances et de réassurances (COMAR), with the support of the Tunisian Ministry of Culture. The first award was given in 1997.

Presented in April of each year at the Municipal Theater of Tunis, or at the Palais des Congrès in 2016 and 2017, these prizes award novels written in French or Arabic by Tunisian authors and published in the previous year.

There are three levels of award: the main COMAR d'Or prize, the Committee's Special Prize and the Discovery Prize (for new authors).

Current and past winners

References 

French-language literary awards
Arabic literary awards
Awards established in 1996
1996 establishments in Tunisia